The FIS World Speed ​​Skiing Championships are a biannual speed skiing competition organized by FIS. A demonstration sport on the occasion of the 1992 Olympic Games in Albertville , the World Championships are today the most prestigious event, followed by the World Cup . The first World Championships officially recognized by the FIS were held in 1995 though they have existed since 1985 .

Venues

Medallists

Men's championship

Women's championship

References

 
 

Speed
Speed
Recurring sporting events established in 1995
Skiing-related lists